Havenhurst is an unincorporated community in southern McDonald County, in the U.S. state of Missouri. The community is located on Missouri Route K, just north of U.S. Route 71, approximately one mile southeast of Pineville. The site is on the bank of Little Sugar Creek.

The community name reflects its development as a resort area.

References

Unincorporated communities in McDonald County, Missouri
Unincorporated communities in Missouri